Tabernanthine is an alkaloid found in Tabernanthe iboga.

It has been used in laboratory experiments to study how addiction affects the brain.

Tabernanthine persistently reduced the self-administration of cocaine and morphine in rats.

Pharmacology 
It is kappa opioid agonist (Ki = 0.15 μM) and NMDA receptor (Ki = 10.5 μM) antagonist. Compared to ibogaine, it binds weakly to σ1 and σ2 receptor.

See also 
 Coronaridine
 Ibogamine
 Voacangine
 Tabernaemontanine
 Tabernanthalog

References 

Alkaloids found in Iboga
NMDA receptor antagonists
Azepines
Quinuclidine alkaloids
Tryptamine alkaloids